New Faces at Newport is a split album by pianist Randy Weston's trio and vibraphonist Lem Winchester's quartet which was recorded in 1958 at the Newport Jazz Festival and released on the MetroJazz label.

Reception

Allmusic awarded the album 3 stars.

Track listing 
All compositions by Randy Weston, except as indicated'
 "Hi-Fly" - 6:38    
 "Excerpt from Bantu Suite" - 9:27    
 "Beef Blues Stew" - 6:33    
 "Machine Blues" - 4:35  
 "Now's the Time" (Charlie Parker)
 "Polka Dots and Moonbeams" (Jimmy Van Heusen, Johnny Burke)
 "Take the "A" Train" (Billy Strayhorn)

Personnel
Randy Weston - piano (tracks 1-4)
George Joyner - bass (tracks 1-4)
Wilbert Hogan - drums (tracks 1-4)
Lem Winchester - vibraphone (tracks 5-7)
Ray Santisi - piano (tracks 5-7)
John Neves - bass (tracks 5-7) 
Jimmy Zitano - drums (tracks 5-7)

References 

Randy Weston live albums
1958 live albums
MetroJazz Records live albums
Albums recorded at the Newport Jazz Festival
1958 in Rhode Island